Blaeu is the name of

 Willem Blaeu (1571–1638), Dutch cartographer and father of Joan Blaeu
 Joan Blaeu (1596–1673), Dutch cartographer and son of Willem Blaeu
 Blaeu Atlas of Scotland, by Joan Blaeu, published in 1654
 Atlas Blaeu or Atlas Maior, by Joan Blaeu, published in 1635
 Stedenboek Blaeu or Toonneel der Steeden, by Joan Blaeu, published in 1649

See also
 Blaauw, a surname